Season 1 of The Great Kenyan Bake Off aired in Kenya and saw twelve home bakers take part in a bake-off to test every aspect of their baking skills as they battled to be crowned The Great Kenyan Bake Off's best amateur baker. Each week saw keen bakers put through two challenges in a particular discipline. The season aired from 7 October 2019 until 9 December 2019. The season was won by Rosemary Akoth Ligondo, with Adeline Prima Serrao and Samira Ali and runners-up.

The Bakers

Results summary

NOTE: No one was eliminated in week 3, so two contestants were eliminated in week 4.

Colour key:

Episodes

Episode 1: Cake Week

Episode 2: Bread Week

Episode 3: Tea Week

NOTE: The judges decided not to eliminate anyone this week, as there were 3 people on the chopping block and they couldn't decide.

Episode 4: Pie Week

NOTE: Since no one was eliminated in week 3, this week there were two contestants eliminated.

Episode 5: Dessert Week

Episode 6: Pastry Week

Episode 7: Biscuit Week

Episode 8: Gluten Free Week

Episode 9: Semi-Final

Episode 10: Final

References 

2019 television seasons
2010s in Kenyan television